InnovaFeed SAS, a French biotechnology company founded in 2016, develops insect-breeding and -processing processes. It sells ingredients derived from insects for animal nutrition and in particular aquaculture.

Through production of a new source of protein, InnovaFeed aims to participate in the development of sustainable aquaculture. Capture fisheries and aquaculture require an increasing supply of proteins and lipids adapted to the nutritional needs of fish.

InnovaFeed has the objective of setting up local production systems. This is made possible by the exclusive use of agricultural by-products to feed its insects, generating no additional impact on natural resources consumption. In addition, insect droppings are valued as organic fertilizers.

History

Creation 
InnovaFeed was created in 2016 by 4 engineers, Clément Ray, Guillaume Gras, Aude Guo and Bastien Oggeri, whose objective was to find alternatives feedstocks. Today, Clément Ray, Bastien Oggeri and Aude Guo are running the company.

Industrial deployment 
In June 2016,  InnovaFeed joined a scientific hub called Évry's Genopole, which enabled it to pursue several research and development projects and to develop its technology. Since October 2017, it has been operating a pilot production unit located near  Gouzeaucourt (France 59) in the Cambrésis region to validate its industrial scale processes and to start commercializing its products.

On 27 September 2018, InnovaFeed publicly announced the construction of a new  production site in  Nesle with a capacity of 10,000 tons of insect protein per year. This future production unit will be implemented next to the  Tereos Group's starch manufacture in order to allow industrial synergies between the two sites: by-product upcycling, energy and logistical savings. On Monday, May 21, 2019, was laid the foundation stone of the site of Nesle.

InnovaFeed announced that by 2022, five new plants will be deployed on the same model as the Nesle site.

Funding 
InnovaFeed first funding round in mid-February 2018 enabled it to secure €15 million from a group of investors led by AlterEquity, a fund that invests in companies whose activities address a major social or environmental challenge.

In November 2018, InnovaFeed announced that it had completed a second round of funding, securing an additional €40 million. The transaction involved a group of European and Asian investors led by Creadev. This investment will enable to strengthen the team as well as support and accelerate InnovaFeed's industrial development on several new production sites.

Business development 

In 2017, InnovaFeed entered in a partnership with the French retailer Auchan to collaborate on the development of new value chains to deliver insect-fed fish.

Auchan first approached the trout industry, an emblematic species of French Aquaculture. In June 2018, the first insect-fed trout were commercialized in Auchan Retail France stores as part of a trial. On July 3, 2018, a tasting of the first trout fed with an insect protein-based feed was organized in partnership with Auchan Retail France. Thetwo Michelin star chef Remy Giraud from the Domaine of Hauts de Loire who prepared the trout said “The insect-fed trout has better conservation, a meat that is more durable. And for the taste, the insect-fed one is much superior and has an excellent texture in the mouth.” Since November 2018, the “insect-fed” trout have been available continuously in 52 Auchan stores in the Ile-de-France and Nord Littoral regions with the plan to expand the scope of the project to the rest of France by the end of 2019.

Technology

Black Soldier fly (Hermetia illucens) 

The insect used in the InnovaFeed process is the larvae of the Black Soldier Fly (Hermetia illucens).

This insect species has been approved by the European Commission for animal feed breeding because it does not transmit pathogen for humans and is non-aggressive.

Breeding techniques 
The by-products used to feed the insects do not generate the consumption of additional natural resources and do not compete with human food. Insect droppings are used as a natural fertilizer for local organic agriculture.

Industrial processes and quality 
InnovaFeed is approved by local authorities for the processing of Category 3 (L) animal by-products in accordance with art. 24.1.a of document CE 1069/2009 (FR 59 269 001).

References

External links 
 

Biotechnology companies of France
French brands
Insect farming companies
Animal food manufacturers
Agriculture companies established in 2016
French companies established in 2016